The 1892 Cleveland Spiders, led by star pitcher Cy Young, finished with a 93–56 overall record, second-best in the National League. In the first split season in Major League Baseball history, the Spiders finished in fifth place during the first half of the season, and in first place during the second half. After the season, they played against the first-half champions, the Boston Beaneaters, in the "World's Championship Series", which the Spiders lost, five games to none (with one tie).

Regular season

Season standings

Record vs. opponents

Roster

Player stats

Batting

Starters by position 
Note: Pos = Position; G = Games played; AB = At bats; H = Hits; Avg. = Batting average; HR = Home runs; RBI = Runs batted in

Other batters 
Note: G = Games played; AB = At bats; H = Hits; Avg. = Batting average; HR = Home runs; RBI = Runs batted in

Pitching

Starting pitchers 
Note: G = Games pitched; IP = Innings pitched; W = Wins; L = Losses; ERA = Earned run average; SO = Strikeouts

Other pitchers 
Note: G = Games pitched; IP = Innings pitched; W = Wins; L = Losses; ERA = Earned run average; SO = Strikeouts

References

External links 
 

Cleveland Spiders seasons
1892 in sports in Ohio
Cleveland Spiders season